Ambrose Hundley Sevier (November 4, 1801 – December 31, 1848) was an attorney, politician and planter from Arkansas. A member of the political Family that dominated the state and national delegations in the antebellum years, he was elected by the legislature as a Democratic US Senator.

Early life and education
Ambrose Hundley Sevier was born near Greeneville, Tennessee in Greene County, Tennessee. Sevier moved to Missouri in 1820 and to Little Rock, Arkansas in 1821. In Arkansas he became clerk of the Territorial House of Representatives. He studied law and was admitted to the bar in 1823.

Marriage and family
Sevier married Juliette Johnson, the sister of Robert Ward Johnson, who also became an influential politician in the state. Their father Benjamin Johnson had gone to Arkansas as the first territorial judge; in 1836 he was appointed as the first federal district judge when the territory became a state. Ambrose and Juliette had several children.

Political career
Sevier was elected to the Territorial House of Representatives and served from 1823 to 1827; he was elected as Speaker of that body in 1827.

He was elected as a Jacksonian Delegate to the 20th US Congress to fill the vacancy caused by the death of Henry Wharton Conway, killed as a result of a duel with a former friend. Sevier was reelected and served as delegate in three successive congresses from 1828 to 1836, when Arkansas was admitted to the Union. Sevier is known as the "Father of Arkansas Statehood".

In 1836 Sevier was elected as the first member of the United States Senate from Arkansas. He was reelected in 1837 and 1843. He resigned from office in 1848. During the 29th Congress, he was allowed to hold the seat of President pro tem of the Senate for a day, though he was not elected to that post. During his tenure, he served as chairman of the Committee on Indian Affairs and was a member of the Committee on Foreign Relations.

In 1848 Sevier and Nathan Clifford, the Attorney General of the United States, were appointed ambassadors to Mexico by President James K. Polk to negotiate the Treaty of Guadalupe Hidalgo at the end of the Mexican–American War.

After completing this project, Ambrose Hundley Sevier died the last day of that year on his plantation in Pulaski County, Arkansas. He was buried in the historic Mount Holly Cemetery. The State of Arkansas erected a monument in the cemetery in his honor.

Sevier was part of the powerful "Family" of Democratic politicians in Arkansas, who included his first cousins: Representative Henry Wharton Conway, Governor James Sevier Conway, and Governor Elias Nelson Conway; brother-in-law Senator Robert Ward Johnson, and son-in-law Governor Thomas James Churchill.

Legacy and honors
He is known as the "Father of Arkansas Statehood."
Sevier County, Arkansas is named in his honor.

See also
 The Family (Arkansas politics)

References

External links

1801 births
1848 deaths
People from Greeneville, Tennessee
Conway-Johnson family
American people of French descent
Delegates to the United States House of Representatives from Arkansas Territory
Jacksonian United States senators from Arkansas
Democratic Party United States senators from Arkansas
Presidents pro tempore of the United States Senate
Chairmen of the Senate Committee on Foreign Relations
Members of the Arkansas Territorial Legislature
Ambassadors of the United States to Mexico
Arkansas lawyers
Deaths in Arkansas